Belize competed at the 2007 Pan American Games in Rio de Janeiro, Brazil from July 13 to 29, 2007. The Belize team consisted of seven athletes (four men and three women) competing in two sports: athletics (track and field) and taekwondo.

Athletics (track and field)

Belize entered six athletes (three per gender).

Key
Note–Ranks given for track events are for the entire round

Track event

Field Events

Taekwondo

Belize entered one male taekwondo athlete.

Men

See also
 Belize at the 2008 Summer Olympics

References

External links
Rio 2007 Official website

Nations at the 2007 Pan American Games
P
2007